The third USS Morris was a schooner in the United States Navy in commission in 1846. She was named for Robert Morris, a Founding Father, Continental Congressman, and major financier of the American Revolutionary War.

Morris served as a despatch boat during the Mexican War, going into service early in 1846. She was wrecked in a hurricane off Key West, Florida on 11 October 1846.

References

 

Mexican–American War ships of the United States
Age of Sail ships of the United States
Schooners of the United States Navy
Dispatch boats of the United States Navy
1846 ships
Shipwrecks of the Florida Keys
Maritime incidents in October 1846
Ships named for Founding Fathers of the United States